Eupithecia millefoliata, the yarrow pug, is a moth of the family Geometridae. The species was first described by Adolph Rössler in 1866 and it can be found in Europe and Russia.

The wingspan is about 21 mm. The moths flies from June to July depending on the location.

The larvae feed on Achillea millefolium.

References

External links
Yarrow pug on UKMoths
Lepiforum e.V.

Moths described in 1866
millefoliata
Moths of Europe
Moths of Asia